Cheese ball or Cheeseball may refer to:

 Bocconcini, mozzarella cheese balls
 Cheese puffs, a processed snack made from puffed corn and cheese, sometimes ball-shaped
 Cheese spread, usually served around Christmas in the United States and Canada
 Edam cheese, a Dutch cheese in the shape of a ball
 Fried cheese curds, breaded and fried cheese curds
 Pão de queijo, or Brazilian cheese ball, a baked cheese bun